The Holy Man (transliterated Al-Mabrouk) is an Egyptian film released on 1959. The film is based on Molière’s play Tartuffe.

Cast and crew

Cast
 Mariam Fakhr Eddine
 Emad Hamdy
 Mahmoud el-Meliguy
 Alwiya Gamil
 Omar el-Hariri
 Samiha Ayoub
 Mohammed Tawfik
 Kadreya Kadry
 Naima Wasfi
 Awatef Ramadan
 Zaki Ibrahim
 Sameera Hussein
 Abdelmoneim Bassiouni
 Abbas el-Daly
 Mohamed Shaaban
 Neamat el-Meligy
 Hussein Ismail
 Abdul Hamid Badawi
 Hamada Jalal
 Abdelmoneim Abdelrahman
 Sayed el-Araby
 Samia Mohsen
 Fifi Said
 Ali Kamel
 Dongel (Ajami Abdel Rahman)
 Khairiya Khairy	
 Nadia Ezzat

Crew
 Mahmoud el-Meliguy (producer)
 Ali Kamel (production manager)
 Silver Star Films (studio)
 Syed Ghorab (production manager)
 Abdulaziz Ali (production assistant)
 Hassan Abduljalil (production assistant)
 Saleh al-Awadi (production assistant)
 Hussein Tawfik (production supervisor)
 Andrea Zendels (sound engineer)
 Artisat Sabbagh (dialogue recorder)
 Ali Muhammad (voice mixer)
 Syed Abdulrahman (voice mixer)
 Hussein Afifi (editor)
 Nahed Makkawi (negative)
 Sayed Bassiouini (film synthesis)
 Nadia Shoukry (music editor)
 Maher Abdelnour (set design)
 Hussein Sharif (props)
 Dongel (Ajami Abdel Rahman) (props)
 Ali Hassan (camera director)
 Ali Khairallah (cameraman)
 Mohamed Shaker (assistant cameraman)
 Hassan Reda (director)
 Mohamed Galal (assistant director)
 Hussein Omar (script)
 Mahmoud Samaha (makeup)
 Ahmed Desouky (makeup assistant)
 Al-Ahram Studios (printing and developing)
 Toto Khoury (celluloid lab manager)
 Mahmoud el-Meliguy (story writer)
 Mohamed Othman (screenplay and dialogue writer)
 Sobhi Basta (cinematographer)
 Fouad El Zahery (music)
 Kamal Merhi (arranger)
 Heliopolis Films (distributor)

Synopsis
The titular holy man cons people into believing in his alleged powers. Asked to treat a woman named Zainab, he researches her family to burnish his credibility. When confronted about the scam, he becomes increasingly evasive.

External links
 El Cinema page
 Dhliz page

References

Egyptian drama films
Films based on works by Molière
Works based on Tartuffe